Kermit Millard  Zarley, Jr. (born September 29, 1941) is an American professional golfer who played on the PGA Tour and the Champions Tour. He is also an author of several books.

Biography
Zarley was born in Seattle, Washington. He graduated from the University of Houston and was a distinguished member of the golf team. He was the individual champion at the 1962 NCAA Division I Championships and also led his team to victory.

Zarley had three dozen top-10 finishes in PGA Tour events during his 18 years on Tour including three wins. Zarley had three top-10 finishes in major championships; his best was a solo 6th at the 1972 U.S. Open. Zarley won once on the Senior/Champions Tour. On both Tours, he finished second or tied for second seventeen times.

Due to his unusual name, Zarley was often called "the Pro from the Moon" or "Moon Man." It is because comedian Bob Hope once interviewed him on national television and remarked, "Kermit Zarley, with a name like that he must be the pro from the moon." In a Wayne and Shuster sketch about a golf tournament being held on the streets of Toronto, Johnny Wayne's character is named "Zarley Kermit, Jr."

In 1965, Zarley co-founded the PGA Tour Bible Study group with fellow PGA Tour players Jim and Babe Hiskey. It  is still active in the world of professional golf. In the period between his careers on the PGA Tour and the Champions Tour, he wrote three books on religion and world affairs. He received an honorary doctorate degree in 2001 from North Park University in Chicago, which has a lecture series named for him. Zarley resides in Scottsdale, Arizona.

Amateur wins
1962 NCAA Championship, Pacific Northwest Amateur

Professional wins (6)

PGA Tour wins (3)

PGA Tour playoff record (0–1)

Tournament Players Series wins (1) 
1984 Tallahassee Open

Other wins (1)
1964 Arizona Open

Senior PGA Tour wins (1)

Senior PGA Tour playoff record (1–2)

Results in major championships

Note: Zarley never played in The Open Championship.

CUT = missed the half-way cut
"T" indicates a tie for a place

Summary

Most consecutive cuts made – 7 (1973 PGA – 1976 PGA)
Longest streak of top-10s – 1 (three times)

Books
The Gospel (1987). Scripture Press. Out-of-print. German adaptation--Das Leben Jesu: Die authentische Biographie (1991). Hanssler.
The Gospels Interwoven (1987). Scripture Press. Reprinted by Wipf & Stock (2001). .
Palestine Is Coming: The Revival of Ancient Philistia (1990). Hannibal Books. Re-issued by Wipf & Stock (2005). .
The Third Day Bible Code (2006). Synergy Books. .
Warrior from Heaven (2009). Synergy Books. .
The Restitution of Jesus Christ (2008). Self-published. No ISBN.
The Solving the Samaritan Riddle: Peter's Keys Explain Early Spirit Baptism (2015). Wipf & Stock. .

References

External links

Servetus the Evangelical

American male golfers
Houston Cougars men's golfers
PGA Tour golfers
PGA Tour Champions golfers
Golfers from Houston
Golfers from Scottsdale, Arizona
Golfers from Seattle
American Christian writers
American Unitarians
1941 births
Living people